William Eldred Toye  (born June 19, 1926) is a Canadian editor, writer and literary critic.

Biography
Toye grew up in Toronto, Ontario. He graduated from the University of Toronto in 1948 where he majored in journalism. He obtained a job with the Canadian branch of Oxford University Press which at the time was nothing more than a desk in a warehouse. He worked at the job for the next 43 years and in 1969 became the Editorial Director. He retired in 1991 and continued with them on a freelance basis after that. Known for his astute editing abilities, he was one of the first people to usher in an expanded and flourishing Canadian publishing business. He was one of the founding editors of the Tamarack Review in 1956 which ended publication in 1982. The early work of many notable Canadian authors appeared in its pages.

Toye has authored or edited several books including the Oxford Companion to Canadian Literature, the Oxford Anthology of Canadian Literature and A Book of Canada. He has also written several children's books.

In 1993 he was made a member of the Order of Canada which said in its award that Toye "has been a highly regarded editor and publisher, well-liked by writers for his patience, fine judgement, tact and unerring taste. An award-winning children's author, he was also one of the founders of The Tamarack Review, where he was influential for many years in the development and encouragement of new Canadian talent."

Works
 A Picture History of Canada (1956) by Clarke Hutton [Contributor, also Ivon Owen]
 The St. Lawrence (1959)
 A Book of Canada (1962)
 The Mountain Goats of Temlaham (1969) with Elizabeth Cleaver
 How Summer Came to Canada (1969) with Elizabeth Cleaver
 Cartier discovers the St. Lawrence (1970)
 Supplement to the Oxford companion to Canadian history and literature (1973)
 Toronto (1975) by John de Visser [Contributor]
 Simon and the Golden Sword (1976) by Frank Newfeld [Contributor, also Kevin W. Macdonald]
 The Loon's Necklace (1977) with Elizabeth Cleaver
 The fire stealer (1979) with Elizabeth Cleaver
 The Oxford Anthology of Canadian literature (1981) with Robert Weaver
 The Oxford Companion to Canadian Literature (1983) with Eugene Benson, 2nd edition, 1997
 City light: a Portrait of Toronto (1983) 
 Letters of Marshall Mcluhan, 1911-1980 (1987) with Corinne McLuhan & Mattie Molinaro
 The concise Oxford companion to Canadian literature (2001)
 William Toye on Canadian literature (2005)

Source:

References

External links
Toye speaking on Canadian Book Design
 Archives of William Toye (Wiiliam Toye fonds, R8606) are held at Library and Archives Canada

1926 births
20th-century Canadian novelists
Canadian male novelists
Living people
Writers from Toronto